Els Baziel Germain de Schepper (born 5 October 1965 in Sint-Niklaas) is a Flemish actress, comedian and writer.

Biography
Els de Schepper studied cabaret at the Studio Herman Teirlinck.
She became known to general public through several appearances on vtm: in 1991 her television career started as a panel member of the consumer program "Raar maar waar" and of the popular "Kriebels", and as an actress in the soap opera "Wittekerke" on VTM. She also hosted the game show "Kinderpraat" and after 1995 took charge of the television quiz show "RIR". Since 2001 she was also leading lady of the "De plaatgast".

Shows
 Konijnen, schoenen en de Schepper (1993)
 Vlaamse Zeep (1995)
 Aaibaarheidsfactor nr. 7 (1997)
 De Witte Negerin (1999)
 Lustobject (2001)
 Puur (2003)
 Intiem (2004)
 Terug Normaal! (2005)
 Supervrouw (2007)
 Els de Schepper Roddelt (2009)
 Niet geschikt als Moeder (2011)
 Feest! (najaar 2013)

Books
 Het heeft zin (2002)
 De ziel die haar naam zelf koos (2004)
 Niet geschikt als moeder (2011)

In autumn 2008, these titles were published as audiobooks too.

Albums
 Vlaamse Zeep
 De witte negerin
 Beauty of it all
 Terug Normaal!
 Supervrouw!
 Ongezouten (2009)

Positions in the Ultratop 50

References

External links
 

1965 births
Living people
Belgian women comedians
Belgian women television presenters
Flemish television presenters
Flemish soap opera actresses
People from Sint-Niklaas
20th-century Flemish actresses
21st-century Flemish actresses
Flemish women writers